Pseudogiria variabilis is a moth of the family Erebidae first described by William Jacob Holland in 1920. It is found in Cameroon, the Democratic Republic of the Congo and Gabon.

References

Moths described in 1920
Calpinae